William Eric Eklow is an electrical engineer with Cisco Systems, Inc. He was named a Fellow of the Institute of Electrical and Electronics Engineers (IEEE) in 2012 for his work in test technology for printed circuit assemblies and systems.

References

Fellow Members of the IEEE
Living people
Year of birth missing (living people)
Place of birth missing (living people)
American electrical engineers